The following is a list of events and releases that happened in 2016 in music in the United States.

Notable events

January
8 — David Bowie released his final album, Blackstar, just two days before his death. It was his first album to debut at number one on the Billboard 200.
11 — Ciara performed the National Anthem at the second College Football Playoff Championship.
15 — Panic! at the Disco released their fifth studio album, Death of a Bachelor. It is their first album to be entirely written and recorded by Brendon Urie, the last remaining member of the band. It is also their first album to debut at number one on the Billboard 200.
28 — Rihanna released her eighth studio album Anti; two days following its release the album was certified platinum by the Recording Industry Association of America (RIAA) after receiving 1 million free downloads in 15 hours due to a deal with Samsung, becoming the fastest certified platinum album in history.

February
7 —  During Super Bowl 50 in Santa Clara, California, Lady Gaga performed "The Star-Spangled Banner" and British band Coldplay performed at halftime with artists Beyoncé, Bruno Mars and Mark Ronson.
15 – The 58th Annual Grammy Awards, hosted by LL Cool J, took place at the Staples Center in Los Angeles. Kendrick Lamar won the most awards of the night with five. Taylor Swift won Album of the Year for the second time with 1989, becoming the first woman to do so; her previous win was for Fearless in 2010. 
26 – Anthrax released their first album in five years, For All Kings.

March
4 — Ninja Sex Party released their first cover album, and album with Tupper Ware Remix Party as their backing band.
5 – Rihanna's single "Work" became the first dancehall song to top the Billboard Hot 100 since Sean Paul's "Temperature" in 2006. It is also her 14th number-one hit, surpassing Michael Jackson, for having the third-most number-one songs of the Hot 100, behind Mariah Carey and The Beatles.
11 — 3 Doors Down released their first album in five years titled Us and the Night.
18 — Gwen Stefani released her first solo album in ten years titled, This Is What the Truth Feels Like. The album became her first number one on the Billboard 200.
19 — I, the Breather played their last concert in Allentown, Pennsylvania.
At the Drive-In's guitarist and co-founder, Jim Ward, leaves the band shortly before their 2016 reunion tour.
25 — Zayn Malik, releases his first solo studio album, Mind of Mine, and becomes the British male artist to debut at No. 1 on the Billboard 200.
30 – R&B singer-songwriter Brandy filed a lawsuit against her label, Chameleon Entertainment Group, for allegedly blocking her from recording and releasing new music.

April
1 — Cheap Trick released their first album in seven years titled Bang, Zoom, Crazy... Hello.
Guns N' Roses performed a concert at the Troubadour, marking the first time Axl Rose performed with classic era band members Slash and Duff McKagan in twenty-three years.
3 – The 51st Annual ACM Awards took place in Las Vegas. Chris Stapleton was the big winner of the night and Jason Aldean won the biggest award of the night, Entertainer of the Year. Luke Bryan and Dierks Bentley were hosts.
The 3rd iHeartRadio Music Awards took place in Inglewood, California. Taylor Swift was the big winner of the night.
7 — Trent Harmon won the fifteenth season of American Idol. This was the show's last season, but was picked up by ABC the following year. La'Porsha Renae is runner-up. All fourteen previous winners, and several Idol alumni took part of the two-hour finale.
21 – Seven time Grammy Award winner Prince dies at his recording studio in Minnesota at the age of 57.
23 — Beyoncé premiered her sixth studio album Lemonade on HBO with an hour-long film. The album was released on Tidal, where it remained exclusively available to stream for 24 hours, until it was uploaded to all formats, including iTunes. Upon the album debuting at number-one on the Billboard 200 chart, Beyoncé became the first act in Billboard history to have their first six albums debut at number one.
29 — Drake releases his first studio album in three years, Views. The album spends longest time atop the Billboard 200 for a rapper, since To the Extreme by Vanilla Ice in 1990, spending 12 weeks at number-one.

May
13 — Chance the Rapper, releases his streaming-only album, Coloring Book, and becomes the first album to chart on the Billboard 200, without selling any copies.
20 — Ariana Grande released her first album in one and a half years titled Dangerous Woman.
20 — Saosin releases Along the Shadow, their first album since 2009 and also their first full-length album with original lead vocalist Anthony Green (who originally left the band before they released their 2006 debut). It is also their first album without lead guitarist Justin Shekoski.
22 – The 2016 Billboard Music Awards took place in Las Vegas, Nevada. Britney Spears won the Millennium Award, Céline Dion won the Icon Award and Rihanna won Chart Achievement Award.
24 — Alisan Porter won the tenth season of The Voice. Adam Wakefield was named runner-up. Hannah Huston and Laith Al-Saadi finishing third and fourth place respectively. Christina Aguilera becomes the first female winning coach in The Voice history.
27 — Thrice released their first album in five years after returning from hiatus.

June
1 – The Dixie Chicks played their first headlining U.S. tour in ten years on the DCX MMXVI World Tour.
10 – Former The Voice contestant Christina Grimmie, age 22, is shot following a concert in Orlando, Florida; she dies from her injuries.
17 - Red Hot Chili Peppers release their first studio album in five years, The Getaway.

July
1 — Blink-182 released California, their first album to feature Alkaline Trio frontman Matt Skiba as a full-time member, and also their first album without founding member Tom DeLonge. It was also their first studio album in five years.
12 — Rachel Platten sang the National Anthem at the 2016 MLB All-Star Game in San Diego.
15 — Good Charlotte released their first album in six years, Youth Authority.
22 — Tonic released their first album in six years, Lemon Parade Revisited.
29 – The Descendents released Hypercaffium Spazzinate, their first studio album in 12 years.

August
6 — Sia became the first female artist over 40 years old to have a number one song, with "Cheap Thrills", since Madonna in 2000.
19 — Frank Ocean releases his first album in four years, Endless, as a visual streaming exclusively on Apple Music.
20 — Frank Ocean releases his first studio album in four years, Blonde.
26 — Britney Spears released her first album in three years, Glory.
26 — Céline Dion released her first French-language studio album in four years, Encore Un Soir and became one of the biggest-selling records of the year. The album was also a tribute to her husband, who passed away 7 months earlier.
28 – The 2016 MTV Video Music Awards took place at Madison Square Garden in New York City. Beyoncé won eight awards, becoming the most-awarded act in the show's history, surpassing Madonna. Rihanna received the Michael Jackson Vanguard Award. Britney Spears makes her first performance in the show in nine years.
29 – With "Ride" charting at number-five and "Heathens" at four in the same week, the musical duo Twenty One Pilots became the third rock act with simultaneous top five Hot 100 singles in the chart's 58-year history, following only the Beatles and Elvis Presley, as well as the first act in 47 years.

September
30 — Solange releases her first album in eight years titled A Seat at the Table.

October
7 — Green Day releases the first album in four years titled Revolution Radio
14 — JoJo released her first album in ten years titled Mad Love.
21 — Lady Gaga released her fourth studio album, Joanne, which debuted at number 1 on the Billboard 200, making her the first woman of the 2010s to have four number one albums 
28 — Dope released their first album in seven years, Blood Money Part 1.

November
2 – The 50th Annual CMA Awards took place live from the Bridgestone Arena in Nashville, Tennessee. Brad Paisley and Carrie Underwood returned to host for the ninth straight year. 
4 — Alicia Keys released her first album in four years, HERE.
11 — A Tribe Called Quest released We Got It from Here... Thank You 4 Your Service, their first studio album since 1998 and also their final studio album.
18 — Metallica released their first album in eight years, Hardwired... to Self-Destruct.
20 – The American Music Awards took place live from the Microsoft Theater in Los Angeles. Ariana Grande wins Artist of the Year.

December
6 – Nominations for the 59th Annual Grammy Awards were announced. Beyoncé lead the nominations with nine for Lemonade.
12 — Live announced the return of original lead vocalist Ed Kowalczyk, who had left the band in 2009.
13 — Sundance Head won the eleventh season of The Voice. Billy Gillman was named runner-up. Wé McDonald and Josh Gallagher finishing third and fourth place respectively.
18 — Fifth Harmony announced that Camila Cabello had left the group.

Bands formed
Cruel Youth
lovelytheband
The Magpie Salute
Nightly
Prophets of Rage
Vimic
Why Don't We
PrettyMuch
Blackpink

Bands reformed

At the Drive-In
Abandon All Ships
The Anniversary
Bash & Pop
Belly
Blake Babies
Boss Hog
The Damned Things
A Different Breed of Killer
Eric B. & Rakim
Galactic Cowboys
Game Theory
G.R.L.
Guided by Voices
Hopesfall
Le Tigre
Letters to Cleo
Misfits (featuring Glenn Danzig)
Nasty Savage
The Number Twelve Looks Like You
Piebald
P.S. Eliot
Rainbow
The Revolution
The Righteous Brothers
Squirrel Nut Zippers
Stabbing Westward
Stir
A Thorn for Every Heart
Temple of the Dog
Thursday
Tickle Me Pink
The Union Underground

Bands on hiatus
Coal Chamber
Flyleaf
Man Overboard
Middle Class Rut
On An On
We Are the in Crowd
Yeah Yeah Yeahs

Bands disbanded

3rdeyegirl
Agalloch
Aiden
Augustines
Bane
Blood on the Dance Floor
Chiodos
Crosby, Stills, Nash & Young
Dinner and a Suit
Dream
Eagles
Empire! Empire! (I Was a Lonely Estate)
Fearless Vampire Killers
Finch
For Today
Funeral for a Friend
Gnashing of Teeth
Gossip
I, the Breather
Joey + Rory
Sharon Jones & The Dap-Kings
A Lighter Shade of Brown
Lionheart
Matchbook Romance
Maybeshewill
Mischief Brew
Motion City Soundtrack
Mudvayne
P.M. Dawn
Thee Satisfaction
School of Seven Bells
Sockweb
Sorry About Dresden
The Stooges
Suicide
Transit
Twisted Sister
You, Me, and Everyone We Know

Albums released in 2016

January

February

March

April

May

June

July

August

September

October

November

December

Top songs on record

Billboard Hot 100 No. 1 Songs
"Black Beatles" – Rae Sremmurd feat. Gucci Mane 
"Can't Stop the Feeling!" – Justin Timberlake 
"Cheap Thrills" – Sia feat. Sean Paul 
"Closer" – The Chainsmokers feat. Halsey 
"Hello" – Adele 
"Love Yourself" – Justin Bieber 
"One Dance" – Drake feat. Wizkid and Kyla 
"Pillowtalk" – Zayn 
"Sorry" – Justin Bieber 
"Work" – Rihanna feat. Drake

Billboard Hot 100 Top 20 Hits
All songs that reached the Top 20 on the Billboard Hot 100 chart during the year, complete with peak chart placement.

Musical theater
Natasha, Pierre & The Great Comet of 1812, written by Dave Malloy: Broadway production starring Josh Groban and Denée Benton

Deaths

January 1 – Gilbert Kaplan, 74, conductor
January 2 – Brad Fuller, 62, composer
January 3 – Jason Mackenroth, 46, drummer (Rollins Band, Mother Superior)
January 4 – Long John Hunter, 84, blues singer-songwriter and guitarist
January 5
Nicholas Caldwell, 71, singer (The Whispers)
Elizabeth Swados, 64, composer
January 7
Robert M. Cundick, 89, organist and composer
Kitty Kallen, 94, singer
Troy Shondell, 76, singer-songwriter
January 8
Otis Clay, 73, R&B singer
Red Simpson, 81, country singer-songwriter
Brett Smiley, 60, singer-songwriter
January 10 - David Bowie, 69, singer-songwriter and actor
January 13 – Bern Herbolsheimer, 67 composer
January 15
Noreen Corcoran, 72, singer
Pete Huttlinger, 54, guitarist
January 16 – Gary Loizzo, 70, singer, guitarist, and producer (The American Breed)
January 17
Blowfly, 76, singer-songwriter and producer
Mic Gillette, 64, bass player (Tower of Power and Sons of Champlin)
Ramblin' Lou Schriver, 86, country singer
January 18 – Glenn Frey, 67, singer-songwriter and guitarist (Eagles)
January 20 – Lee Abramson, 45, bass player and composer
January 22 – Cadalack Ron, 34, rapper
January 26
Margaret Pardee, 95, violinist
T.J. Tindall, 65, guitarist (MFSB)
January 28
Signe Toly Anderson, 74, singer (Jefferson Airplane and KBC Band)
Paul Kantner, 74, singer-songwriter and guitarist (Jefferson Airplane, Jefferson Starship, and KBC Band)
January 29 – Billy Faier, 85, banjo player
February 1 – Jon Bunch, 45, singer-songwriter (Sense Field and Further Seems Forever)
February 3
Big Kap, 45, hip-hop DJ and producer
Maurice White, 74 singer-songwriter and producer (Earth, Wind & Fire)
February 4
Leslie Bassett, 93, composer
Joe Dowell, 76, singer
Jimmie Haskell, 79, composer and conductor
February 5 – Ray Colcord, 66, composer
February 6
Dan Hicks, 74, singer-songwriter, guitarist, and drummer (The Charlatans)
Sam Spence, 88, composer
February 8 – Ken Delo, 77, singer (The Lawrence Welk Show)
February 11
Bob Raymond, 69, bassist (Sugarloaf)
Kim Williams, 68, songwriter
February 12 – George Tipton, 84, composer and conductor
February 14
Steven Stucky, 66, composer
L. C. Ulmer, 87, blues singer-songwriter
February 15
Louis Lane, 92, conductor
Joyce Paul, 78, singer
Vanity, 57, singer-songwriter (Vanity 6)
February 17 – Ray West, 90, sound mixer (Star Wars Episode IV: A New Hope)
February 18 – Paul Gordon, 52, keyboard player and producer (New Radicals and The B-52's)
February 21 – Betty Jane Watson, 94, singer
February 22 – Sonny James, 87, country singer-songwriter
February 24 – Lennie Baker, 69, singer and saxophonist (Sha Na Na and Danny & the Juniors)
February 26 – C. L. Blast, 81, soul singer
March 1
Gayle McCormick, 67, singer (Smith)
Martha Wright, 92, singer
March 3 – Gavin Christopher, 66, R&B singer-songwriter and producer
March 4
Bankroll Fresh, 28, rapper
Joey Feek, 40, country singer (Joey + Rory)
March 5
Jimmy Henderson, 61, rock guitarist (Black Oak Arkansas)
Chip Hooper, 53, talent agent
March 6 – Aaron Huffman, 43, bassist (Harvey Danger)
March 7 – Joe Cabot, 94, jazz trumpeter and bandleader
March 8 – Ron Jacobs, 78, producer, co-creator of American Top 40
March 9
Karen Carroll, 58, singer
Ray Griff, 75, country singer
March 10
Ernestine Anderson, 87, singer
Gogi Grant, 91, singer
March 11
Joe Ascione, 54, jazz drummer
Shawn Elliott, 79, singer
Ruth Terry, 95, singer and actress
March 12 – Tommy Brown, 84, R&B singer
March 13 – Sidney Mear, 97, trumpeter
March 15 – Daryl Coley, 60, gospel singer
March 16 – Frank Sinatra, Jr., 72, singer-songwriter
March 17 – Steve Young, 73, country singer-songwriter
March 18
David Egan, 61, singer-songwriter
Ned Miller, 90, country singer-songwriter
March 22 – Phife Dawg, 45, rapper (A Tribe Called Quest)
March 23 – James Jamerson, Jr., 58, bass player (Chanson)
March 25 – Shannon Bolin, 99, actress and singer
March 26 – David Baker, 84, composer
March 29 – Patty Duke, 69, singer
March 30 – Frankie Michaels, 60, singer
March 31 – Terry Plumeri, 71, bassist, composer, and conductor
April 2 – Gato Barbieri, 83, jazz saxophonist and composer
April 3 – Bill Henderson, 90, jazz singer
April 4 – Carlo Mastrangelo, 78, doo-wop singer and bassist (The Belmonts)
April 5
Leon Haywood, 74, singer-songwriter and producer
Zena Latto, 90, jazz clarinetist and saxophonist
April 6
Dennis Davis, 66, drummer
Merle Haggard, 79, country singer-songwriter and guitarist
April 7 – Jimmie Van Zant, 59, singer-songwriter and guitarist
April 8 – Jack Hammer, 90, singer-songwriter and pianist
April 9 – Tony Conrad, 76, composer
April 12 – Gib Guilbeau, 78, musician and songwriter (The Flying Burrito Brothers)
April 13
Jeremy Steig, 73, jazz flutist
Pete Yellin, 74, jazz saxophonist
April 18 – Brian Asawa, 49, opera singer
April 19
Richard Lyons, 57, experimental musician (Negativland)
Pete Zorn, 65, multi-instrumentalist (Steeleye Span)
April 21
Lonnie Mack, 74, singer-songwriter and guitarist
Prince, 57, musician, singer-songwriter
April 24 – Billy Paul, 81, soul singer
April 25 – Remo Belli, 88, jazz drummer
May 7 – John Stabb, 54, singer (Government Issue)
May 12 – Julius La Rosa, 86, singer
May 13 – Buster Cooper, 87, jazz trombonist
May 14
Johnny Sea, 75, country music singer
Paul Smoker, 75, composer and jazz trumpeter
May 15 – Jane Little, 87, classical double bass player (Atlanta Symphony Orchestra)
May 16 – Emilio Navaira, 53, singer-songwriter
May 17 – Guy Clark, 74, singer-songwriter
May 21 – Nick Menza, 51, drummer and instrumentalist (Megadeth, OHM)
May 27 – Marshall "Rock" Jones, 75, bassist (Ohio Players)
May 28 – Floyd Robinson, 83, country singer
May 30 – Thomas Fekete, 27, guitarist (Surfer Blood)
June 4 – Phyllis Curtin, 94, soprano
June 8 – Norro Wilson, 79, country music singer-songwriter and record producer
June 9 – J. Reilly Lewis, 71, choral conductor and Baroque music specialist
June 10 – Christina Grimmie, 22, singer-songwriter
June 12 – Chris Warren, 49, singer and musician
June 13
Anahid Ajemian, 92, violinist
Randy Jones, 72, jazz drummer (Chet Baker, Dave Brubeck, Maynard Ferguson)
Chips Moman, 79, songwriter and record producer
June 16
Jerome Teasley, 67, soul drummer
Charles Thompson, 98, jazz pianist
June 17 – Attrell Cordes, 46, singer and rapper (P.M. Dawn)
June 20 – Bill Ham, 79, manager (ZZ Top)
June 21 – Wayne Jackson, 74, trumpeter (Mar-Keys, The Memphis Horns)
June 22 – Steve French, 56, gospel singer
June 23
Shelley Moore, 84, jazz singer
Ralph Stanley, 89, singer and banjoist (The Stanley Brothers)
June 24 – Bernie Worrell, 72, keyboardist (Parliament-Funkadelic)
June 26 – Mike Pedicin, 98, saxophonist and jazz bandleader
June 27 – Sir Mack Rice, 82, singer-songwriter
June 28 – Scotty Moore, 84, guitarist (Elvis Presley)
June 29
Stan Harper, 94, virtuoso harmonica player, arranger and composer
Rob Wasserman, 64, composer and bassist
June 30 – Don Friedman, 81, jazz pianist
July 3 – Richard Grayson, 75, composer and pianist
July 5 – Gladys Nordenstrom, 92, composer
July 6 – Danny Smythe, 67, drummer (The Box Tops)
July 9
Geneviève Castrée, 34, singer and guitarist
Maralin Niska, 89, operatic soprano
Carole Switala, 69, singer and voice actress
July 14 – Lisa Gaye, 81, actress, singer and dancer
July 15
Charles Davis, 83, jazz saxophonist
Erik Petersen, 38, singer-songwriter and multi-instrumentalist (Mischief Brew)
July 16
Bonnie Brown, 77, singer (The Browns)
Alan Vega, 78, singer (Suicide)
Claude Williamson, 89, jazz pianist
July 17 – Gary S. Paxton, 77, record producer, singer-songwriter (Skip & Flip, The Hollywood Argyles)
July 21 – Lewie Steinberg, 82, bassist (Booker T. & the M.G.'s)
July 22 – Dominic Duval, 71, free jazz bassist
July 24 – Marni Nixon, 86, singer
July 25 – Allan Barnes, 66, jazz saxophonist (The Blackbyrds)
July 26 – Sandy Pearlman, 72, record producer and band manager (Blue Öyster Cult, The Clash, Black Sabbath)
July 27 – Pat Upton, 75, singer, guitarist, songwriter (Spiral Starecase)
July 30 – Gloria DeHaven, 91, actress and singer
August 3 – Ricci Martin, 62, musician and singer, son of Dean Martin
August 4 – Patrice Munsel, 91, coloratura soprano
August 5 – Richard Fagan, 69, songwriter and musician
August 6 – Pete Fountain, 86, jazz clarinetist
August 7
B. E. Taylor, 65, singer
Ruby Winters, 74, soul singer
August 11 – Glenn Yarbrough, 86, folk singer
August 12 – Ruby Wilson, 68, blues and gospel singer
August 13 – Connie Crothers, 75, jazz pianist
August 14
DJ Official, 39, Christian hip hop musician (116 Clique)
James Woolley, 49, keyboardist (Nine Inch Nails)
August 15 – Bobby Hutcherson, 75, jazz vibraphone and marimba player
August 17 – Preston Hubbard, 63, bassist (The Fabulous Thunderbirds)
August 19 – Lou Pearlman, 62, record producer and manager (Backstreet Boys, NSYNC)
August 20
Irving Fields, 101, pianist
Matt Roberts, 38, guitarist (3 Doors Down)
Louis Smith, 85, jazz trumpeter
August 25 – Rudy Van Gelder, 91, recording engineer
August 30 – Hoot Hester, 65, country music and bluegrass artist (The Time Jumpers)
September 1
Fred Hellerman, 89, folk singer, guitarist, songwriter (The Weavers)
Kacey Jones, 66, singer-songwriter
September 2 – Jerry Heller, 75, music manager (N.W.A.)
September 6 – Clifford Curry, 79, R&B singer
September 16 – Jerry Corbetta, 68, singer-songwriter and keyboardist (Sugarloaf)
September 17 – Charmian Carr, 73, actress and singer
September 19 – Bobby Breen, 87, actor and singer
September 20 – Micki Marlo, 88, singer and model
September 21
John D. Loudermilk, 82, singer and songwriter
Shawty Lo, 40, rapper
September 24 – Buckwheat Zydeco, 68, accordionist and zydeco musician
September 25
Michael Jones (aka Kashif), 59, multi-instrumentalist, singer, songwriter, record producer (B.T. Express)
Jean Shepard, 82, singer-songwriter
October 8 – Don Ciccone, 70, singer-songwriter (The Critters)
October 24 – Bobby Vee, 73, pop singer
October 27 – John Zacherle, 98, television and radio personality, novelty singer
November 3 – Kay Starr, 94, jazz and pop singer
November 11 – Victor Bailey, 56, jazz bassist
November 13 – Leon Russell, 74, singer
November 14 – Holly Dunn, 59, singer
November 18 – Sharon Jones, 60, soul singer (Sharon Jones & The Dap-Kings)
November 29 – Allan Zavod, 71, keyboardist (Frank Zappa, Jean-Luc Ponty, Eric Clapton, etc.)
December 2 – Mark Gray, 64, singer, songwriter, and keyboardist (Exile)
December 4 – Ralph Johnson, 67, singer (The Impressions)
December 7 – Brian Bennett, 65, garage-rock keyboardist (The Cherry Slush)
December 11 – Joe Ligon, 80, gospel singer (Mighty Clouds of Joy)
December 19 – Andrew Dorff, 40, songwriter
December 25 – Alphonse Mouzon, 68, jazz fusion drummer
December 28 – Debbie Reynolds, 84, actress and singer

See also
2010s in music
2016 in music

References

2016 in American music